Events in the year 1939 in Germany.

Incumbents

National level
Head of State and Chancellor

 Adolf Hitler (the Führer) (Nazi Party)

Events
 23 January – "Dutch War Scare": Admiral Wilhelm Canaris of the Abwehr leaks misinformation to the effect that Germany plans to invade the Netherlands in February, with the aim of using Dutch airfields to launch a strategic bombing offensive against Britain. The "Dutch War Scare" leads to a major change in British policies towards Europe.
 27 January – Adolf Hitler orders Plan Z, a 5-year naval expansion programme intended to provide for a huge German fleet capable of crushing the Royal Navy by 1944. The Kriegsmarine is given the first priority on the allotment of German economic resources.

 30 January – Hitler gives a speech before the Reichstag calling for an "export battle" to increase German foreign exchange holdings. The same speech also sees Hitler's "prophecy" where he warns that if "Jewish financers" start a war against Germany, the "result will be the annihilation of the Jewish race in Europe".
 6 February – In a response to Georges Bonnet's speech of 26 January, German Foreign Minister Joachim von Ribbentrop, referring to Bonnet's alleged statement of 6 December 1938 accepting Eastern Europe as being in Germany's exclusive sphere of influence, protests that all French security commitments in that region are "now off limits".
 22 March – After an ultimatum of March 20, Nazi Germany takes Memelland from Lithuania.
 25 March – German troops occupy the remaining parts of Bohemia and Moravia; Czechoslovakia ceases to exist. The Ruthenian region of Czechoslovakia declares independence as Carpatho-Ukraine.
 3 April – Adolf Hitler orders the German military to start planning for Fall Weiss, the codename for the invasion of Poland.
 28 April – In a speech before the Reichstag, Adolf Hitler renounces the Anglo-German Naval Agreement and the German–Polish declaration of non-aggression.
 May – Hitler agrees to a request from the father of a three-year-old boy born blind and with missing limbs for his son to be euthanised.
 22 May – Germany and Italy sign the Pact of Steel.
 6 July – The last remaining Jewish enterprises in Germany are closed by the Nazis.

 23 August – Molotov–Ribbentrop Pact: Adolf Hitler and Joseph Stalin agree to divide Europe between themselves (Finland, Estonia, Latvia, eastern Poland and Basarabia (today Moldavia), north-east province of Romania to the USSR; Lithuania and western Poland to Germany).
 26 August – The Kriegsmarine orders all German-flagged merchant ships to head to German ports immediately in anticipation of the invasion of Poland.
 1 September – At 04.45 Central European Time, the German battleship Schleswig-Holstein opens bombardment on the Westerplatte, a Polish military base outside Danzig, firing what are, according to many sources, the first shots of the war. At the same time, regular Wehrmacht troops begin crossing the border into Poland.
 2 September – Following the invasion of Poland, Danzig (now Gdańsk, Poland) is annexed to Nazi Germany.
 3 September – The United Kingdom, France, New Zealand and Australia declare war on Germany.
Of the 1,418 aboard, 117 are killed (98 passengers and 19 crew members).
 4 September – Nepal declares war on Germany.
 6 September – South Africa declares war on Germany.
 10 September – Canada declares war on Germany.
 15 September – Diverse elements of the German Wehrmacht surround Warsaw and demand its surrender. The Poles refuse and the siege begins in earnest.
 28 September – Nazi Germany and the Soviet Union agree on a division of Poland after their invasion.
 28 September – Warsaw surrenders to Germany; Modlin surrenders a day later; the last Polish large operational unit surrenders near Kock 8 days later.
 October – Action T4 programme begins, meaning that the state will now euthanise people deemed "unworthy" of life due to physical disabilities or mental illness, as keeping them alive would not be seen as good use of taxpayers money by the state or its supporters.
 8 October – Germany annexes Western Poland.
 14 October – The  sinks the British battleship .
 6 November – Sonderaktion Krakau: Germans take action against scientists from the University of Kraków and other Kraków universities at the beginning of World War II.
 9 November – Venlo Incident: Two British agents of SIS are captured by the Germans.
Admiral Graf Spee is scuttled by its crew off Montevideo harbour on December 17.
 29 December – Police issue a warrant for the arrest of the tycoon Fritz Thyssen who once funded but now opposes the Nazis. He is believed to be in Portugal

Births

 15 January – Hartmut Geerken, German musician, composer, writer, journalist, playwright and filmmaker
 8 February – Karl-Heinz von Hassel, German actor (died 2016)
 21 January – Ivan Stein, German Sprinter
 13 February – Beate Klarsfeld, German-born Nazi hunter
 21 February – Gert Neuhaus, German artist
 31 March – Volker Schlöndorff, German film director
 31 March – Karl-Heinz Schnellinger, German footballer
 22 April – Theo Waigel, German politician
 24 April – Ernst Zündel, German publisher and pamphleteer (died 2017)
 28 April – Burkhard Driest, German film director and writer
 14 May – Rupert Neudeck, German journalist (died 2016)
 18 May – Peter Grünberg, German physicist, Nobel Prize in Physics laureate
 23 May – Reinhard Hauff, German film director
 24 May – Ferdinand Schladen, shot putter
 25 May – Klaus Naumann, German general
 26 May – Manfred Kanther, German politician
 1 July – Volker Kempe, German scientist, manager and entrepreneur
 13 August – Erika Berger, German television presenter and author (died 2016)
 4 September – Erwin Teufel, German politician
 7 September – Christine Bergmann, German politician
 8 September – Carsten Keller, German field hockey player
 17 September – Günther Fielmann, German entrepreneur
 24 September – Dieter Schwarz,  German entrepreneur
 25 September – Harald Ringstorff, German politician
 8 November – Erich Kellerhals, German businessman (died 2017)
 9 November – Björn Engholm, German politician
 6 December – Klaus Balkenhol, German equestrian

Deaths

 4 March – Oswald Freisler, German lawyer (suicide) (born 1895)
 3 May – Wilhelm Groener, German soldier and chief of German General staff (born 1867)
 22 May – Ernst Toller, German playwright (born 1893)
 11 August – Jean Bugatti, German automobile designer (born 1909)
 31 August – Wilhelm Bölsche, German journalist and science writer (born 1861)
 16 September 
 Ludwig R. Conradi, German evangelist, missionary (born 1856)
 Otto Wels, German politician (born 1873)
 17 September – Otto Röhm, German entrepreneur (born 1876)
 24 September – Carl Laemmle, German film producer (born 1867)
 29 November – Philipp Scheidemann, Chancellor of Germany (born 1865)
 31 December – Georg Wertheim, German entrepreneur (born 1857)
 Full date unknown – Otto Berg, chemist (born 1873)

References

 
Years of the 20th century in Germany
Germany
Germany